Owens is an unincorporated community in Brown County, Texas, United States. According to the Handbook of Texas, the community had no population estimates in 2000. It is located within the Brownwood, Texas micropolitan area.

History
The area in what is known as Owens today was first settled in the early 1870s. A post office was established at Owens in 1878 and remained in operation until sometime after 1930. It was named Clio until it was changed to Owens for E. Owens, who donated land for the townsite in 1910. Sawmills were constructed here by John W. Yantis. Owens had a church, several scattered houses, and two businesses in the 1930s. In 1949, the community had only one business and 100 residents. Four years later, it had no more businesses and the population dropped to 40. Its last population was recorded as 60 in 1965, after which there was no census data reported. It had one business and a few churches in 1983 and continued to be listed on county maps in 2000.

Geography

Education
Owens had its own school in the 1930s. Today, the community is served by the May Independent School District.

References

Unincorporated communities in Brown County, Texas
Unincorporated communities in Texas